Darevskia tuniyevi is a lizard species in the genus Darevskia. It is found in Turkey.

References

Darevskia
Reptiles described in 2022